Nese Ni is a Taiwanese American producer, songwriter and singer. In 2014, Nese wrote Jolin Tsai's "Play 我呸". The song received coverage in TIME magazine and was nominated for multiple music awards such as "Best Song of the Year", "Best Arranger", and "Best Music Video" in the 26th Golden Melody Awards.

Early life 
Nese was born in Seattle, Washington, United States. He learned piano and violin since childhood and graduated from the University of Washington with a degree in Visual Arts.

Career

Early career 
Nese was deeply influenced by Western music and began to release his songs in the Chinese music industry upon his return to Taiwan. In 2006, Nese wrote three songs in Elva Hsiao's "1087" album, including "Confession 表白". His unique style of EDM began to receive acclamation, and gradually led to the rise of his prominence as the top producer of hip-hop and electronic dance music in the Chinese music industry.

In 2008, Nese collaborated with Elva Hsiao again in the "3 Faced Elva 3面夏娃" album, continuing his legacy of dynamic rhythms and chic music styles. He also participated in the rap performance of the song "We’re a Great Match 速配程度". In the same year, Nese participated in the songwriting and singing of the theme songs "Superman" and "Jue Dui Wu Di 絕隊無敵" for the popular drama "Hot Shot 籃球火".

Songwriter and producer 
In the recent years, Nese has cooperated with many well-known Asian singers, including Jolin Tsai, Amei, Eason Chan, Wilber Pan, Sammi Cheng, Lu Han, Hankyung, Cyndi Wang, A-Lin, Lollipop F, Amber An, Momo Wu, and the Korean girl group GFRIEND, Japanese group LOL, etc.

In 2014, Nese composed Jolin Tsai's "Play 我呸" and co-arranged the song with Starr Chen, with Katie Lee writing the lyrics. This song broke the record for various charts in the Chinese music industry and won multiple awards, including the most viewed music video in 2014 from YouTube Taiwan, 2015 German Red Dot Award: Brands & Communication Design, the champion of 5th Global Chinese Golden Chart from Hit FM, 2015 Hito Top Ten Chinese Songs of the Year and 2014 Top 100 Singles Champion from Hito Music Awards, and 2014 Top Ten Singles from The Association of Music Workers in Taiwan, etc.

Nese is currently the general manager of the music production company "Gangge Wenchuang 岡歌文創". He has also participated in various songwriting camps to promote multicultural exchanges with music and has done co-writing with musicians from around the globe. He has participated in the 2016 Finland A Pop Castle Songwriting Camp, and Warner Chappell Asia Pacific Songwriting Camp, etc. He has worked with musicians from many countries such as China, Hong Kong, Taiwan, Singapore, Malaysia, Japan, South Korea, and Finland, etc. In 2018, Nese was invited to participate in the first songwriting camp jointly organized by Musikmakarna/Songwriters Academy of Sweden and Asia, to exchange music inspirations with Swedish musicians.

In 2020, in the album "Imperfect Imperfections 不完美人生指南", Nese released the song "Anti-Perfect 不屑完美" with A-Lin, leading her to make a breakthroughs in music genre.

Performance career 
After cooperating with music producer Jim Lee in "Hot Shot 籃球火" in 2008, Working Master compiled Nese's original demos and released "Working Master - Nese’s Demo Collection". At that time, Nese also participated in many live performances, including TV shows like GTV 100 Entertainment and Taichung City's New Year's Eve Concert.

Artistry 
Influenced by Western music, Nese's works are more westernized with a chic style and strong rhythms. His works cover a wide array of styles ranging from upbeat electronic dance music to ballad love songs.

Works

Awards 
In 2014, "Play我呸" won the 2015 Top Ten Chinese Songs and 2014 Top 100 Singles from Hito Music Awards, and 2014 Top Ten Singles from The Association of Music Workers in Taiwan. The song was also nominated for "Best Song of the Year", "Best Music Video" and "Best Arranger" in the 26th Golden Melody Awards.

References 

American people of Taiwanese descent
Record producers from Washington (state)
Songwriters from Washington (state)
Singers from Washington (state)
Musicians from Seattle
University of Washington alumni
Year of birth missing (living people)
Living people